Expedition on Fadak may refer to:

Expedition of Ali ibn Abi Talib (Fadak), 627 AD, 8th month of 6AH
Expedition of Bashir Ibn Sa’d al-Ansari (Fadak), December 628 AD, 3rd month 7AH
Expedition of Ghalib ibn Abdullah al-Laithi (Fadak), January 629 AD, 7AH

See also
Conquest of Fadak, May 628 AD, 2nd month of 7AH

Campaigns ordered by Muhammad